The Illinois Department of Juvenile Justice (IDJJ) is the code department of the Illinois state government that acts as the state juvenile corrections agency.

The department was formed on July 1, 2006. Previously, the Illinois Department of Corrections managed Illinois' juvenile facilities.

Facilities
, the Illinois Youth Center (IYC) facilities in operation included the following detention centers, statewide:

Harrisburg, St. Charles, Pere Marquette, and Chicago house juvenile male offenders while Warrenville houses juvenile female offenders.  IYC Pere Marquette is a treatment facility for juvenile males. The majority of youths committed to the department from the Chicago area go first to IYC St. Charles.

Facilities in Kewanee and Murphysboro, previously Illinois Youth Centers, were closed and reopened as Adult Life Skills and Reentry Centers.

See also

Juvenile delinquency
Juvenile Justice and Delinquency Prevention Act
Office of Juvenile Justice and Delinquency Prevention

References

External links
 

Juvenile Justice
State corrections departments of the United States
Juvenile detention centers in the United States
2006 establishments in Illinois
Government agencies established in 2006